Micropterix islamella is a species of moth belonging to the family Micropterigidae. It was described by Hans Georg Amsel in 1935. It is known from Palestine.

References

Micropterigidae
Moths described in 1935
Taxa named by Hans Georg Amsel